Wicklowia aquatica is a freshwater fungus species in the genus Wicklowia that is found in Florida and Costa Rica. Wicklowia aquatica produces the depsidone compound folipastatin.

References

Pleosporales
Fungi described in 2010
Fungi of Florida
Fungi of Central America
Fungi without expected TNC conservation status